Brzezicki (feminine: Brzezicka; plural: Brzeziccy) is a Polish surname. Notable people with the surname include:

 Juan Pablo Brzezicki (born 1982), Argentine tennis player
 Mark Brzezicki (born 1957), English musician
 Steve Brzezicki, English musician, younger brother of Mark

See also
 

Polish-language surnames